Shanta Kumar (born 12 September 1934) is an Indian politician who was the 3rd Chief Minister of Himachal Pradesh and a Union Minister in the Government of India. He is a member of the Bharatiya Janata Party. He was elected to the 9th Lok Sabha from Kangra constituency in 1989. He was re-elected to the Lok Sabha in 1998, 1999 and 2014 from the same constituency. He has written a number of books.

Early life
Shanta Kumar was born to Jagannath Sharma and Kaushalya Devi on 12 September 1934 in Garhjamula, Kangra district, Himachal Pradesh.

Political career
His political career began in 1963 when he was elected as a Panch in the Gram Panchayat for Garhjamula. He was subsequently elected as a member of the Panchayat Samiti in Bhawarna and then was president of Zilla Parishad in Kangra from 1965 to 1970.

He was elected to the Himachal Pradesh Legislative Assembly in 1972. He remained a member till 1985. He was re-elected to the House again in 1990 and continued till 1992. He became the Chief Minister of Himachal Pradesh in 1977. He held the post till 1980 and came back to head the Government again in 1990 and stayed till 1992. He had enforced "No Work,No Pay" policy during his second term as Chief Minister for strongly dealing with the striking government employees. He was the Leader of Opposition in the Himachal Pradesh Legislative Assembly from 1980 to 1985.

He was elected to the 9th Lok Sabha in 1989 from Kangra. He was re-elected twice in 1998 and 1999. He was a senior minister in the Atal Bihari Vajpayee government from 1999 to 2004. He was Union Minister of Consumer Affairs and Public Distribution from 1999 to 2002 and Union Minister of Rural Development from 2002 to 2004.

He was elected to the Rajya Sabha from Himachal Pradesh in 2008. In 2014, he was elected to the 16th Lok Sabha from Kangra. In 2014-15 he chaired a committee on the restructuring of the Food Corporation of India (FCI).

Personal background

He was married to Santosh Shailja in year 1964. He has three daughters Indu Sharma,Renu Mujumdar,Shalini Sathyan and a son Vikram Sharma. His wife died in December 2020 due to coronavirus at Dr Rajendra Prasad Government Medical College, Tanda. She worked as teacher in initial years but later quit her job and switched over to writing and social work among women and underprivileged sections and also wrote some books.

Election results

Writing
Kumar's books include:

Dharti Balidan Ki, 1962
Himalaya Par Lal Chhaya, 1964
Vishwa Vijeta Vivekanand, 1968
Lajo, 1976
Man Ke Meet, 1976
Kaidi, 1976
Jyotirmayi, 1977
O Pravasi Meet Mere, 1977
Mrigtrishna, 1980
Kranti Abhi Adhoori Hai, 1985
Deewar Ke Us Paar, 1995
Rajneeti Ki Shatranj, 1997
Tumhare Pyar Ki Pati, 1999
Vrinda, 2007
A Patriot monk Swami Vivekananda, 2012

References

People from Kangra, Himachal Pradesh
Chief ministers from Bharatiya Janata Party
Chief Ministers of Himachal Pradesh
1934 births
Living people
India MPs 1999–2004
India MPs 1989–1991
India MPs 1998–1999
Lok Sabha members from Himachal Pradesh
Rajya Sabha members from Himachal Pradesh
India MPs 2014–2019
Leaders of the Opposition in Himachal Pradesh
Chief ministers from Janata Party
Janata Party politicians
Bharatiya Janata Party politicians from Himachal Pradesh
Bharatiya Jana Sangh politicians